The 1921–22 Indiana State Sycamores men's basketball team represented Indiana State University during the 1921–22 NCAA men's basketball season. The head coach was Birch Bayh, coaching the newly christened Sycamores in his fourth season. The team played their home games at North Hall in Terre Haute, Indiana.

Schedule

|-

References

Indiana State Sycamores men's basketball seasons
Indiana State
Indiana State
Indiana State